The women's shot put at the 2014 European Athletics Championships took place at the Letzigrund on 15 and 17 August.

Medalists

Records

Schedule

Results

Qualification
17.50 (Q) or at least 12 best performers (q) advanced to the Final.

Final

References

Shot Put W
Shot put at the European Athletics Championships
2014 in women's athletics